FFS may refer to:

Computing
 Feige–Fiat–Shamir identification scheme, in cryptography
 Flash file system
 Formatted File System
 Find first set, a type of bit operation
 FreeFileSync, a software package
 Amiga Fast File System
 Berkeley Fast File System

Music
 FFS (band), a rock supergroup of Franz Ferdinand and Sparks
 FFS (album), their debut album

Organizations

Political organizations
 For our Future’s Sake, a UK campaign group calling for a public vote (People's Vote) on the final Brexit deal
 Social Forces Front, a political party in Burkina Faso
 Socialist Forces Front, a political party in Algeria

Other organizations
 Frankford Friends School, in Philadelphia, Pennsylvania, United States
 French Federation of Speleology
 Swiss Federal Railways

Places 
 FFS Arena, in Lund, Sweden
 Frankfurt South station, in Germany
 French Frigate Shoals, an island in the Northwestern Hawaiian Islands

Science and technology
 Facial feminization surgery
 Free-fall sensor
 Fringe field switching
 Full flight simulator

Other uses 
 Farmer Field School, a community development process
 Fee-for-service, a payment model
 For Film's Sake, Australian women's film festival
 Fully fashioned stockings, stockings with reinforce toe and tops